Venetian Lovers is a 1925 German silent drama film directed by Walter Niebuhr and Frank A. Tilley and starring Arlette Marchal, Hugh Miller and John Mylong.

The film's art direction was by Willy Reiber. It was made at the Emelka Studios in Munich.

Cast
 Arlette Marchal as Countess Lola Astoni  
 Hugh Miller as Count Astoni  
 John Mylong as Chevalier Tomasso  
 John Stuart as Bob Goring  
 Margarete Schlegel as Marquita  
 Maria Mindzenty as Betty Bradshaw  
 Ben Field as William P. Bradshaw  
 Eva Westlake as Mrs. Bradshaw  
 Georg H. Schnell as Sir Harcourt

References

Bibliography
 Palmer, Scott. British Film Actors' Credits, 1895-1987. McFarland, 1988.

External links

1925 films
German drama films
German silent feature films
1925 drama films
1920s German-language films
Films set in Venice
Films shot in Germany
Films shot at Bavaria Studios
Films based on British novels
Silent drama films
1920s German films